Sloboda is a Serbian ammunition and manufacturing company founded in 1948. Its headquarters is in Čačak, Serbia. With around 2,000 employees, it is one of the largest enterprises in Čačak and Moravica District.

History
Sloboda was established on 12 October 1948 by the Yugoslav government. In Tito's Yugoslavia, it was one of the largest enterprises in the country, having around 7,000 employees. It manufactured a variety of products, for military use and for home appliances. The production was greatly reduced during the 1990s breakup of Yugoslavia, when Western countries imposed sanctions on Serbia and Montenegro. During the 1999 NATO bombing of Yugoslavia, the company's facilities were several times bombed.

In 2016, one of its destroyed facilities was reconstructed and put into operation. In November 2017, former prominent company's subsidiary "Sloboda aparati" (home appliances), finally transferred its facilities to Sloboda Čačak (military ammunition). During 2017, the Government of Serbia invested two million euros in company's modernization, for the needs of defense industry. From 2010 to 2017, 30 million euros has been invested in company's facility. As of 2017, the company has around 2,300 employees and new contracts worth 150 million euros. In May 2018, the Serbian Minister of Defence announced further investments over the next three years.

In 2018, the company celebrated its 70-year anniversary.

Products
Sloboda manufactures different types of ammunition and RPG-s.

Among them are:
 M79 Osa
 M80 Zolja
 M90 Stršljen
 100mm, 125mm Tank ammunition
 20, 23, 30, 37, 40 and 57mm caliber ammunition
 76, 100, 105, 122, 152, 155mm artillery ammunition

Incidents
On 12 January 2010, one employee was hurt after explosion in pyrotechnics department of the factory. 

On 27 December 2010, there were series of explosions in pyrotechnics department, however nobody was injured. On 1 July 2013, two employees were injured in an explosion in a production line.

On 4 June 2021 (in early morning around 1:30 AM), there were series of explosions in an ammunition depot, which caused a huge fire. Several workers and nearby residents were evacuated, but no injuries have been reported.

On 19 June 2021 (in the afternoon around 8 PM) there was one big explosion at gunpowder depot; three employees were hurt.

See also
 Defense industry of Serbia

References

External links
 
 Vulin: Slobodan je onaj narod koji ima snažnu vojsku at blic.rs 

1948 establishments in Serbia
Ammunition manufacturers
Companies based in Čačak
Defense companies of Serbia
Manufacturing companies established in 1948